Boulder star coral may refer to two different species of coral:

 Orbicella annularis, a species of coral in the family Merulinidae
 Orbicella franksi, a species of coral in the family Merulinidae